.450 Nitro Express also known as the .450 Nitro Express 3-inch is a rifle cartridge designed for hunting dangerous game such as elephant, rhino, cape buffalo, lion, and leopard. This cartridge is used almost exclusively in double rifles for hunting in the Tropics or hot climates in general and is associated with the Golden Age of African safaris and Indian shikars.

Development
The .450 Nitro Express was the first Nitro Express cartridge, developed around 1898 by John Rigby.

Early cartridges used the black powder case that was designed for around 22,000 psi and not the 34,000 psi that the Cordite load generated. Case extraction was difficult, especially in warmer climates such as Africa and India where the cartridge was primarily used. To remedy this problem, a reinforced case was produced and Kynoch made a reduced load to lower the case pressure.  Another problem lay in the sensitivity of Cordite, loads developed in the cool British climate performed differently in the tropical heat of Africa and India, resulting in excessive pressures.  The manufacturers responded by developing "tropical loads" with reduced propellant.

These initial problems led to Holland & Holland developing the .500/450 Nitro Express and Eley Brothers developing the .450 No 2 Nitro Express, both of which offered very similar performance to the original .450 Nitro Express.  By the time these two cartridges appeared, the early issues with the .450 Nitro Express had been resolved, and it quickly became the most popular and widely used dangerous game hunting round.

Following the British Army 1907 ban of .450 caliber ammunition into India and the Sudan, instead of developing their own replacement Rigby adopted Joseph Lang's .470 Nitro Express as their standard double rifle cartridge. By the time the ban was lifted the .470 NE had largely supplanted the .450 NE as the industry's most popular elephant cartridge, and Mauser's Gewehr 98 bolt actioned rifles offered cheaper alternatives to the expensive double rifles required by the Nitro Express cartridges.

WWI service
In 1914 and early 1915, German snipers were engaging British Army positions with impunity from behind steel plates that were impervious to .303 British ball ammunition. In an attempt to counter this threat, the British War Office purchased 62 large bore sporting rifles from British rifle makers, including 47 of .450 caliber rifles, which were issued to Regiments, some British officers also supplied their own.

On one notable occasion, Richard "Dickie" Cooper brought down three Albatros D.III fighters from Ernst Udet's squadron, Jagdstaffel 15, with his Holland & Holland .450 Nitro Express big-game double rifle. Cooper is recorded as saying: "I aimed well ahead of the leader. He came down like a pheasant, as did the one that followed, and I had time to reload and fire again at the third before he passed over - he also crashed."

Users
Prominent users of the  .450 Nitro Express include Agnes Herbert, Arthur H. Neumann, Major Chauncey H. Stigand and Denys Finch Hatton, the latter had a gunsmith rebarrel his .475 No 2 Nitro Express Lancaster double rifle into .450 Nitro Express as it was easier to find ammunition.

See also
 List of rifle cartridges
 11 mm caliber other cartridges of similar caliber size.
 Nitro Express
 Table of handgun and rifle cartridges

References

External links
 Ammo-One, ".450 Nitro Express", ammo-one.com, retrieved 11 August 2017.
 Cartridgecollector, ".450 3 " Nitro Express", cartridgecollector.net, retrieved 11 August 2017.
 John Rigby & Co, "Our history: More than 240 years of experience", johnrigbyandco.com, retrieved 11 August 2017.
 Kynoch Ammunition, "Big Game Cartridges", www.kynochammunition.co.uk, 1 January 2015.

Pistol and rifle cartridges
British firearm cartridges
John Rigby & Co cartridges
Military cartridges